The men's cross-country competition at the 2014 Asian Games was held on 30 September 2014 at the Yeongjong Baegunsan MTB Course.

Schedule
All times are Korea Standard Time (UTC+09:00)

Results 
Legend
DNF — Did not finish

References
Results

External links
Official website

Mountain Men